Taleh District is a district in the eastern Sool region of Somaliland. Its capital lies at Taleh, the former headquarters of the Somali Dervish State.

Education

There are 6 schools operating in Taleh serving 600 students.

See also
Administrative divisions of Somaliland
Regions of Somaliland
Districts of Somaliland
Somalia–Somaliland border

References

External links
Administrative map of Taleex District

Districts of Somaliland
Sool, Somaliland